Stupar is a Serbian/Bosnian/Croatian surname.

Notable people with this surname include:
Jonathan Stupar (born 1984), American football tight end
Milan Stupar (born 1980), Serbian footballer
Miloš Stupar, Bosnian Serb commader
Myroslav Stupar (born 1941), Ukrainian footballer and referee
Nate Stupar (born 1988), American football linebacker
Paul Stupar (1866 – 1928), Austro-Hungarian admiral
Slobodanka Stupar (born 1947), Serbian visual artist
Tanja Stupar-Trifunović (born 1977), Bosnian-Serbian writer

Bosnian surnames
Croatian surnames
Serbian surnames